A list of University College London people in the Law. University College London (UCL) is one of two founding colleges of University of London. The UCL Faculty of Laws Has been ranked by The Guardian as one of the top law schools. UCL attendees and alumni who have served in the legal profession are included in this list.

Alumni

International
 Andrew Cayley, UCL (LLM): International Co-Prosecutor of the Khmer Rouge Tribunal in Cambodia
 Taslim Olawale Elias, UCL (BA, LLB, PhD): Chief Justice of the Supreme Court of Nigeria (1972–1975); Judge of the International Court of Justice (1976–1991); President of the International Court of Justice (1982–1985)
 Hassan Bubacar Jallow: current Prosecutor of the International Criminal Tribunal for Rwanda (ICTR)

Europe
 Terry Davis, UCL (LLB 1962): former Secretary General of the Council of Europe
 Paul J. Mahoney, UCL (LLM 1969, Lecturer): current and first President of European Union Civil Service Tribunal
 Christos Rozakis, UCL (LLM 1970): first vice-president of the European Court of Human Rights, former Deputy Foreign Minister of Greece

UK
 John Baker, UCL (LLB, PhD): Downing Professor of the Laws of England, University of Cambridge
 Peter Birks: former Regius Professor of Civil Law, University of Oxford
 Dame Margaret Booth: High Court judge
 David Childs, managing partner of Clifford Chance
 Herbert Cozens-Hardy: former Master of the Rolls
 Geoffrey Dear: former Her Majesty's Inspectorate of Constabulary
 Sir Roderick Evans (LLB), former British judge of the High Court of England and Wales and presiding Judge for Wales (2007)
 Peter Goldsmith: former Attorney General for England and Wales
 Arnold Goodman: lawyer and political advisor
 Sir Nicholas John Hannen, Chief Justice of the British Supreme Court for China and Japan (1891-1900)
 Baron Farrer Herschell, Lord Chancellor of Great Britain
 Sir George Jessel, UCL (BA, MA): first Jewish Solicitor General for England and Wales (1871–1873); first Jewish regular member of the Privy Council; first Jewish judge in UK; Master of the Rolls (1873–1883)
 Nicola Lacey (LLB): former Professor of Criminal Law and Legal Theory at the University of Oxford, currently Professor of Law, Gender and Social Policy at the London School of Economics
 Dame Bernice Lake QC – first Eastern Caribbean woman to be appointed Queen's Counsel
 Sir Gavin Lightman, UCL (LLB, Fellow),  High Court judge (Chancery Division)
 Sir Vincent Lloyd-Jones, High Court judge
 Andrew Reid (LLB), Lawyer, Racehorse trainer, and Treasurer of the UK Independence Party
 Leonard Sainer, solicitor and retailer
 Patricia Scotland, former Attorney General for England and Wales and Attorney General for Northern Ireland
 Anthony Scrivener (LLB), barrister famous for defending Tony Martin (2001) and Saddam Hussein (2005) against mass murder charges
 Thomas Edward Scrutton, former Lord Justice of Appeal
 Maurice Watkins (LLB, LLM): Director of Manchester United's football board and club's solicitor
 Sir Alfred Wills, High Court judge
 Harry Woolf, Baron Woolf, Master of the Rolls (1996-2000), Lord Chief Justice of England and Wales (2000-2005)

Americas
 Rudranath Capildeo, UCL (BSc, MSc, PhD, Lecturer): Trinidad and Tobago Barrister at Law (Attorney-at-Law), mathematician, politician, former leader of Democratic Labour Party and leader of the Opposition
 The Rt. Hon. Sir Vincent Floissac, Chief Justice and President of East Caribbean Appeal Court
 Dia Forrester, First Female Attorney General of Grenada

Africa
 Samuel Azu Crabbe, UCL (LLB): former Chief Justice of Ghana, President of the National Olympic Committee of Ghana
 Josiah Ofori Boateng, UCL (LLB): retired Justice of the Supreme Court of Ghana (1999–2001); former Electoral Commissioner of Ghana (1989–1992)
 Samuel Eson Johnson Ecoma, UCL (LLB): former Chief Judge of Cross River State, Nigeria
 William Bedford Van Lare, UCL (LLB): Ghanaian jurist and diplomat, former justice of the Supreme Court of Ghana
 Isaac Wuaku, UCL (LLB): retired justice of the Supreme Court of Ghana

Asia

China
 Wu Ting-fang (伍廷芳), UCL Law, first ethnic Chinese barrister in UK (Lincoln's Inn) (1876) and Hong Kong (1877), the first ethnic Chinese member of the Legislative Council of Hong Kong, Hong Kong's first ethnic Chinese Justice of the Peace.
 Chang Tao-fan (張道藩), UCL art student: former President of the Legislative Yuan (1952–1961)
 Cheng Tien-Hsi (鄭天錫), UCL (LLD): former Vice-President of the Legislative Yuan, Member of Permanent Court of International Justice, the last Ambassador of Republic of China to UK

Hong Kong
 Winston Chu UCL (LLB), former Chairman of Society for Protection of the Harbour, founding Partner at Winston Chu & Company Solicitors
 Joseph Fok, Permanent Judge of Hong Kong Court of Final Appeal
 Daniel Fung, first ethnic Chinese Solicitor General of Hong Kong (1994-1998)
 W. Meigh Goodman, former Chief Justice of Hong Kong
 Simon Li (李福善), (1922-2013) former Vice-President of Court of Appeal (Hong Kong) and first ethnic Chinese High Court Judge in (Hong Kong)
 Sir Yang Ti-liang, Chief Justice of Hong Kong (1988–1996)

India
 Mohandas Karamchand Gandhi, UCL law student: called to the bar of England and Wales by Gray's Inn; leader of the Indian independence movement and "Father of the Nation". Popularly known as 'Mahatma' and 'Gandhiji'. Inspirational political leader; assassinated but founded a dynasty.
 Adarsh Sein Anand: former Chief Justice of the Supreme Court of India
 Sudhi Ranjan Das: former Chief Justice of the Supreme Court of India
 Kuldip Singh: former Judge, Supreme Court of India (1988–96); Advocate General, Punjab (1987); Additional Solicitor General of India (1987–88)

Malaysia
 Arifin Zakaria, Chief Justice of Malaysia (2011–2017)

Singapore
 Thirugnana Sampanthar Sinnathuray: Judge of the High Court of Singapore
 Chao Hick Tin: Vice-President of the Court of Appeal of Singapore, former Attorney-General of Singapore
 Tan Boon Teik: former Attorney-General of Singapore
 Koh Juat Jong, UCL (BSc): former acting Attorney-General of Singapore, Registrar of the Supreme Court of Singapore, and Solicitor-General of Singapore
 J. B. Jeyaretnam: former Registrar of the Supreme Court, former Secretary-General of the Workers' Party (Singapore) and founder of the Reform Party (Singapore)
 Belinda Ang: judge of the Appellate Division of the High Court
 Chan Seng Onn: former Solicitor-General and High Court judge
 Michael Palmer (politician): former Speaker of the Parliament of Singapore who resigned following an extra-marital affair
 Sylvia Lim: former law lecturer at Temasek Polytechnic, counsel at Peter Low & Choo, and chairperson of the Workers' Party (Singapore)
 Jerrold Yam, lawyer and poet
 Soh Rui Yong: national long-distance runner

Middle East
 Gabriel Bach: former Prosecutor in the trial against Adolf Eichmann, former Justice of Supreme Court of Israel
 Michael Sfard: Israeli Human Rights Lawyer

Oceania
 John William Salmond: Judge of the High Court of New Zealand

Staff

 John Austin –  Jeremy Bentham Professor of Law and Philosophy, formerly Quain Professor of Jurisprudence, major figure in jurisprudence, critic of legal positivism.
 Eric Barendt: Professor of Media Law; co-authored several editions of groundbreaking textbook on UK Social Security Law
 Ian Dennis: Professor of English Law
 Ronald Dworkin: Emeritus Professor of Jurisprudence
 Dame Hazel Genn - Professor of Empirical Legal Studies, current Dean of UCL Law faculty
 Sir Malcolm Grant - Professor of Law and Vice-Dean (1986–91), subsequently appointed the 9th UCL President and Provost (2003–13)
 Stephen Guest - Emeritus Professor of Legal Philosophy, Principal Research Associate
 Sir Robin Jacob - former Lord Justice of Court of Appeal in England and Wales, now Sir Hugh Laddie Chair and Professor in Intellectual Property Law.
 Anthony Julius - Chair in Law and the Arts
 Sir Hugh Laddie: former Professor of Intellectual Property Law; Queen's Counsel; former High Court judge
 Lord Collins of Mapesbury - Professor of Law
 Sir Basil Markesinis – Professor of Common Civil Law, Queen's Counsel
 Richard Moorhead - Professor of Law and Professional Ethics
 Philippe Sands: Professor of International Law; distinguished human rights practitioner; cases included appearance before International Court of Justice for Gambia regarding alleged genocide in Burma in opposition to Aung San Suu Kyi of that country's National League for Democracy
 Scott Shapiro - Visiting Quain Professor of Law, UCL
 Eleanor V. E. Sharpston, UCL lecturer 1990-92: current Advocate General at the Court of Justice of the European Union
 Timothy Swanson: former Chair in Law & Economics
 William Twining - Quain Professor of Jurisprudence Emeritus
 Harry Woolf, Baron Woolf – former judicial posts included Lord Chief Justice of England and Wales; alumnus; and among other roles taught as a UCL visiting professor.
 Brenda Hale, Baroness Hale of Richmond: Honorary Professor of Law
 Paul S Davies: Professor of Commercial Law
 Michael Veale: Associate Professor of Law

See also
 UCL Faculty of Laws
 List of University College London people

References

 
UCL Law